Godfrey Lightbourn (10 January 1930 – 10 October 2013) was a Bahamian sailor. He competed in the Flying Dutchman event at the 1960 Summer Olympics.

References

External links
 

1930 births
2013 deaths
Bahamian male sailors (sport)
Olympic sailors of the Bahamas
Sailors at the 1960 Summer Olympics – Flying Dutchman
Sportspeople from Nassau, Bahamas